Justin Brumbaugh (March 2, 1905 – July 3, 1951) was an American football player who played one season for the Frankford Yellow Jackets of the National Football League. Brumbaugh played college football at the Bucknell University.

After football he ended up becoming a civil engineering with the Foster Wheeler Corp.
At Billings Montana.
According to his obituary

References

1905 births
1951 deaths
American football quarterbacks
American football running backs
Bucknell Bison football players
Frankford Yellow Jackets players
Players of American football from Pennsylvania
People from Springdale, Pennsylvania